Scott City is a city in Cape Girardeau and Scott counties in the U.S. state of Missouri. The population was 4,346 at the 2020 census. The Scott County portion of Scott City (the majority) is part of the Sikeston Micropolitan Statistical Area, while the Cape Girardeau County portion is part of the Cape Girardeau–Jackson, MO-IL Metropolitan Statistical Area.

History
The town of Fornfelt and the area of Ancell were consolidated with Scott City March 7, 1960 while Illmo, Missouri, was incorporated into Scott City in 1980.  The town of Fornfelt was previously known as Edna, but this name was changed as it was too similar to Edina, Missouri.  Whipporwhill Hollow was the previous name of Illmo. The present name is derived from Scott County.

In December 1848, a cholera epidemic was brought to New Orleans by emigrant ships. Within a few weeks, it was carried to all the principal cities on the Ohio and Mississippi Rivers.  Six of the victims were Irish monks headed to a monastery near Dubuque, Iowa. These monks were buried a few hundred yards northwest of the Thebes-Scott City railroad bridge.

Geography
Scott City is located at  (37.218486, -89.524063).

Demographics

2010 census
At the 2010 census there were 4,565 people, 1,794 households, and 1,245 families living in the city. The racial makeup of the city was 96.93% White, 0.68% Black or African American, 0.26% Native American, 0.24% Asian, 0.83% from other races, and 1.05% from two or more races. Hispanic or Latino of any race were 1.45%.

Of the 1,794 households 36.2% had children under the age of 18 living with them, 50.2% were married couples living together, 14.4% had a female householder with no husband present, 4.8% had a male householder with no wife present, and 30.6% were non-families. 26.1% of households were one person and 11% were one person aged 65 or older. The average household size was 2.54 and the average family size was 3.02.

The median age was 36.3 years. 25.6% of residents were under the age of 18; 9.1% were between the ages of 18 and 24; 27.3% were from 25 to 44; 24.8% were from 45 to 64; and 13.2% were 65 or older. The gender makeup of the city was 48.3% male and 51.7% female.

2000 census
At the 2000 census there were 4,591 people, 1,801 households, and 1,287 families living in the city. The racial makeup of the city was 98.26% White, 0.39% African American, 0.37% Native American, 0.04% Asian, 0.13% from other races, and 0.81% from two or more races. Hispanic or Latino of any race were 0.63%.

Of the 1,801 households 35.1% had children under the age of 18 living with them, 53.8% were married couples living together, 13.3% had a female householder with no husband present, and 28.5% were non-families. 24.8% of households were one person and 10.5% were one person aged 65 or older. The average household size was 2.54 and the average family size was 3.02.

The age distribution was 26.6% under the age of 18, 9.0% from 18 to 24, 29.1% from 25 to 44, 22.9% from 45 to 64, and 12.4% 65 or older. The median age was 35 years. For every 100 females, there were 92.7 males. For every 100 females age 18 and over, there were 87.6 males.

The median household income was $31,958 and the median family income  was $36,763. Males had a median income of $30,088 versus $17,061 for females. The per capita income for the city was $15,099. About 8.6% of families and 12.8% of the population were below the poverty line, including 22.6% of those under age 18 and 13.5% of those age 65 or over.

Government

Presidential

Education
Scott City R-I School District includes the majority of Scott City in Scott County. operates Scott City Elementary School, Scott City Middle School, and Scott City High School. A portion of Scott City in Scott County is in the Kelso C-7 School District. The portion of Scott City in Cape Girardeau County is in the Cape Girardeau 63 School District, which operates Central High School.

Scott City has a public library, a branch of the Riverside Regional Library.

References

External links
 Cape Girardeau

 

Cities in Cape Girardeau County, Missouri
Cities in Scott County, Missouri
Cape Girardeau–Jackson metropolitan area
Cities in Missouri